Jiwan Luitel (born: September 10, 1981) is a Nepali film actor who won the title of Mr. Nepal in 2002.

His first film was Tirkha. He has worked in more than 65 Nepali films till this date. He achieved the award of KTV Best Debutant Actor for his film Nasib Aafno in 2010 and also awarded as Best Actor in NFDC National Film Award (2069) for Maliti Ko Bhatti in 2013.

Personal life 
Luitel was born on 10 September 1981 in Morang. A fashion model, in 2002, he became Mr. Nepal and subsequently began his acting career in the Nepalese Film Industry (Kollywood). Luitel participated in the Sydney Fashion Show in 2009, the same year he was badly injured doing a stunt for a film.

Filmography

Awards

References

Living people
People from Morang District
Nepalese male models
21st-century Nepalese male actors
Year of birth missing (living people)